Born to Laugh at Tornadoes is a 1983 album by the art-funk band Was (Not Was). Rolling Stone declared it "conceptually, the best album of the year" shortly after its release. Despite the glowing reviews, Tornadoes made little commercial impact in a year dominated by Michael Jackson's Thriller and Prince's 1999. (It did manage to become the band's first release to make it onto Billboard's album chart, peaking at #134 in a nine-week stay in the fall of 1983.)

This album boasted an impressive array of guest vocalists, ranging from hard rocker Mitch Ryder (on "Bow Wow Wow Wow"), former Black Sabbath vocalist Ozzy Osbourne ("Shake Your Head"), rock band The Knack's lead vocalist Doug Fieger (on "Betrayal" and "Smile"), Marshall Crenshaw ("The Party Broke Up") and torch song vocalist/songwriter Mel Tormé (lead vocal on the closing song "Zaz Turned Blue").

The album also displayed a wide variety of musical styles, ranging from pop love ballads ("Betrayal") to rock ("Bow Wow Wow Wow"), psychedelic synthesized mod music ("Man Vs. The Empire Brain Building") and even easy listening cocktail jazz ("Zaz Turned Blue", a ballad about a man who nearly chokes to death in a park).

Also noteworthy is a credit to Robert Kinkel as Assistant Engineer; Kinkel went on to be co-creator of the Trans-Siberian Orchestra. The front cover illustration, "After Compton's", was credited to Dan Chapman in 1953 and Jeri McManus was the art director.

Track listing

Personnel
David Was - vocals, Korg organ, vibraphone, harmonica, flute
Don Was - Oberheim Obsx synthesizer, Moog bass synthesizer, emulator synthesizer, Clavinet, bass, rhythm guitar, cello, timpani, Linn drums, Simmons drums
Sir Harry Bowens - vocals
Sweet Pea Atkinson - vocals
Marshall Crenshaw – organ and vocals on "The Party Broke Up"; lead guitar on "Smile"
Ozzy Osbourne – vocals
Mitch Ryder – vocals
Vinnie Vincent – second lead guitar
Joseph LoDuca – guitar
Mel Tormé – piano, vocals
Carol Hall – vocals
Wayne Kramer – guitar on "The Party Broke Up"
Marin Alsop – violin
Chris Blackwell – vocals
Jervonny Collier – bass
Michael Edwards – vocals
Doug Fieger – vocals on "Smile"
Kathy Kosins – vocals
Yogi Horton – drums
Michael "Smitt E. Smitty" Smith – Simmons drums
Bob Kulick – power chord guitar
Jay Leonhart – bass
David McMurray – soprano and tenor saxophone
Bruce Nazarian – guitar
Luis Resto – acoustic piano, Moog synthesizer, Oberheim Obxa synthesizer, vocoder, synthetic trumpet
Paul Riser – horn & string arrangement on "Knocked Down, Made Small (Treated Like a Rubber Ball)"
John Robie – synthesizer
John Sinclair – background vocals
Randy Jacobs – bass, guitar, background vocals
Lawrence Fratangelo – percussion
Fred Zarr - acoustic piano, synthesizer
Felix Morris - bass
Technical
Debbie Caponetta - production co-ordination 
Michael Zilkha - Executive Producer
David Thoener and The Detroit Wasmopolitan Mixing Squad (Duane Bradley, Ken Collier and Don Was) - mixing

References

Was (Not Was) albums
1983 albums
Albums arranged by Paul Riser
Albums produced by Don Was
Albums produced by David Was
Geffen Records albums
ZE Records albums